Michel Tresor Komesha Tornéus (born 26 May 1986) is a Swedish former long jumper.

Biography
He competed at the 2009 European Indoor Championships, the 2009 World Championships and the 2010 World Indoor Championships without reaching the final.

He made a name for himself in 2005 at 19 years of age when he jumped 7.94 meters, just 1 cm short of the Swedish junior record. He set a personal best jump of 8.11 metres in June 2009 at Ullevi.

He was first in the long jump for Sweden in the 2010 European Team Championships First League section and went on to finish ninth in the event final at the 2010 European Athletics Championships. He started his 2011 indoor season in strong form, taking four straight wins, including a personal best of 8.13 m to win in front of a home crowd at the XL Galan.

He won his first senior medal in 2012, a bronze at the 2012 European Athletics Championships in Helsinki. He then finished one centimetre behind a medal in the long jump at the 2012 Summer Olympics.

He began 2013 in fine form breaking the Swedish indoor long jump record. He competed at the 2013 European Athletics Indoor Championships on home soil in Gothenburg, jumping a new national record of 8.27 metres in the first round, before jumping 8.29 metres in the final round, only two centimetres behind winner Aleksandr Menkov.

At the 2015 European Athletics Indoor Championships Tornéus won his first international gold medal, after beating the Swedish indoor record in the final.

At the 2017 World Championships in Athletics held in London, he obtained the 8th place in the men's long jump event, clearing 8.18 metres.

Tornéus retired in 2019.

Personal life
His father was born in Democratic Republic of Congo and his mother is from the Finnish (Meänkieli) speaking region of Torne Valley in Sweden. Tornéus' original athletics club is the Tullinge-Tumba finska förening (Finnish association of Tullinge-Tumba) track and field program.

Achievements

References

External links

 Personal website
 Hammarby IF Friidrott

1986 births
Living people
Swedish male long jumpers
Swedish people of Democratic Republic of the Congo descent
Swedish sportspeople of African descent
Athletes (track and field) at the 2012 Summer Olympics
Athletes (track and field) at the 2016 Summer Olympics
Olympic athletes of Sweden
European Athletics Championships medalists
People from Fittja
World Athletics Championships athletes for Sweden
Hammarby IF Friidrott athletes
Sportspeople from Stockholm County
21st-century Swedish people